Wancho is a Konyak language of north-eastern India. Wancho is spoken in 36 villages of southeastern Longding district, Tirap district, Arunachal Pradesh, as well as in Assam and Nagaland (Ethnologue). Alternate names include 
Banpara Naga, Joboka, Jokoba.

People
Wancho is spoken by the Wancho people who have a population of 56,866 according to a 2011 consensus, and mainly populate the Indian state of Arunachal Pradesh. Although a minority, these inhabitants have a rich culture with rituals, ceremonial practices, religion, and various dialects of Wancho.

Dialects
Ethnologue lists the following dialects of Wancho.

Changnoi
Bor Muthun (Bor Mutonia)
Horu Muthun
Kulung Muthun (Mithan)

There is significant variation among the dialects spoken in the upper and lower regions.

Orthography
Wancho is generally written in either Devanagari or Latin script.
Between 2001 and 2012, teacher Banwang Losu devised a unique alphabetic Wancho script which is taught in some schools. In 2019, the script was officially published into Unicode 12.0.

References

Robbins Burling & Mankai Wangsu (1998) "Wancho Phonology and word list", Linguistics of the Tibeto-Burman Area 21.2.

 
Languages of Assam
Languages of Arunachal Pradesh
Languages of Nagaland
Sal languages
Endangered languages of India